The NAIA Division II Men's Basketball Championship  is the former tournament held by the NAIA to determine the national champion of men's college basketball among its Division II members in the United States and Canada.

The tournament was held annually from 1992 to 2019, after which the NAIA consolidated its two divisions, returning to the single national championship for men's and women's basketball that it held between the event's establishment in 1937 and the division split in 1992.

Over its twenty-eight year history, the tournament was played in four different cities and at five different venues. Unlike the NCAA's annual basketball tournaments, where games are played at an assortment of regional sites over the course of several weeks, all NAIA tournament games were played at a single, centralized arena. 

Bethel (IN), Cornerstone, Indiana Wesleyan, and Oregon Tech won the most NAIA Division II national titles, with three each.

Results

Champions  

 Schools highlighted in yellow have reclassified athletics from the NAIA.

See also
NAIA Division I Men's Basketball Championship
NAIA Division I Women's Basketball Championship
NAIA Division II Women's Basketball Championship
NCAA Division I men's basketball tournament
NCAA Division II men's basketball tournament
NCAA Division III men's basketball tournament

References